Calomycterus is a genus of oriental broad-nosed weevils in the beetle family Curculionidae. There are about 11 described species in Calomycterus.

Species
These 11 species belong to the genus Calomycterus:
 Calomycterus brevicollis Voss, 1957 c g
 Calomycterus distans (Faust, 1886) c g
 Calomycterus inaequalis Marshall, 1941 c g
 Calomycterus jucundus Voss, 1943 c g
 Calomycterus modestus (Faust, 1890) c g
 Calomycterus nodosus Marshall, 1941 c g
 Calomycterus obconicus Chao, 1974 c g
 Calomycterus obesus Faust, 1897 c g
 Calomycterus periteloides (Faust, 1886) c g
 Calomycterus setarius Roelofs, 1873 i c g b (imported long-horned weevil)
 Calomycterus strigiceps Marshall, 1934 c g
Data sources: i = ITIS, c = Catalogue of Life, g = GBIF, b = Bugguide.net

References

Further reading

External links

 

Entiminae
Articles created by Qbugbot